The Tor 991 is a class of patrol boats design and built in Thailand. The design of the patrol boat was initiated by King Bhumibol in 2003. The first vessel, T.991 was launched on the April 30, 2007.

References 

Ships of the Royal Thai Navy
Patrol boat classes
Ships built in Thailand